Encymachus is a genus of African jumping spiders that was first described by Eugène Louis Simon in 1902.  it contains only two species, found only in Africa: E. hesperus and E. livingstonei.

References

Salticidae genera
Salticidae
Spiders of Africa